Sister Cities is a 2016 American drama television film directed by Sean Hanish, based on the 2006 play of the same name by Colette Freedman. The film stars Stana Katic, Jess Weixler, Michelle Trachtenberg, and Troian Bellisario as the four sisters along with Jacki Weaver, Alfred Molina, Amy Smart, and Tom Everett Scott filling out the rest of the cast. It premiered on Lifetime on September 17, 2016.

Plot
After Mary Baxter appears to drown herself in her bathtub, Austin, her second oldest daughter who has been taking care of her, calls home her three half-sisters, Carolina, Dallas and Baltimore. There, the four deal not only with their mother's death but unresolved issues they had with her and each other.

Cast
 Jacki Weaver as Mary Baxter, 71, the mother of the four women.
 Amy Smart as 41- to 63-year-old Mary
 Jess Weixler as Austin Baxter, 29, a writer who moved back home to take care of Mary. Her father is Mort, who is also Mary's best friend. She is a lesbian with a girlfriend named Sarah.
 Ava Kolker as 8-year-old Austin
 Stana Katic as Carolina "Carol" Baxter Shaw, 37, a lawyer who is on track to being a judge, she is the daughter of Mary and Roger. She is also an alcoholic.   
 Kaia Gerber as 13- to 16-year-old Carolina
 Roxie Hanish as 7-year-old Carolina
 Michelle Trachtenberg as Dallas Baxter, 27, a perfectionist, married to Peter, in the process of a divorce. Her father was Sully, who died in a car accident. 
 Kayla Levine as 6-year-old Dallas
 Troian Bellisario as Baltimore Baxter, 21, the youngest sister. She is an eccentric college student. Her father was a piano player at a jazz club.
 Serendipity Lilliana as Young Baltimore 
 Alfred Molina as Mort Stone, 62, Austin's father and best friend of Mary Baxter.
 Fidel Gomez as Young Mort
 Tom Everett Scott as Chief Barton Brady, 39, Carolina's ex-love interest. He is also chief of police.
 Aimee Garcia as Sarah, 31, Austin's girlfriend 
 Kathy Baker as Janis, a publisher 
 Peter Jason as Dr. Timmins
 Patrick Davis as Carlos
 Colette Freedman as Brontë

Production

Casting
On July 16, 2015, Kaia Gerber was cast as a young Carolina. On July 20, 2015, it was confirmed that Troian Bellisario, Stana Katic, Jess Weixler, and Michelle Trachtenberg had signed on to play the four sisters, Baltimore, Carolina, Austin, and Dallas, respectively. The following day, it was confirmed Jacki Weaver and Amy Smart was cast as a Mary and young Mary, respectively along with Alfred Molina. Aimee Garcia joined the cast as Sarah, a girlfriend of one of the sisters.

Filming
Principal photography began on July 10, 2015, in Los Angeles when, after "only about 3 shots into filming" a grenade was found on set and production was stopped for two hours.

References

External links
 
 

2016 drama films
2016 films
2016 independent films
2016 LGBT-related films
2016 television films
American films based on plays
American independent films
American LGBT-related films
American drama television films
Films about euthanasia
Films about sisters
Films shot in California
Lesbian-related films
Lifetime (TV network) films
2010s American films